Szydłowo  is a village in Piła County, Greater Poland Voivodeship, in west-central Poland. It is the seat of the gmina (administrative district) called Gmina Szydłowo.

The village has a population of 750.

References

Villages in Piła County